Copella eigenmanni is a species of fish in the splashing tetra family found along the Atlantic coast between Pará to Delta Amacuro, the mouth of the Orinoco. They grow no more than a few centimeters.

The fish is named in honor of ichthyologist Carl H. Eigenmann (1863-1927), who collected the type specimen.

References

External links
 

Fish of Brazil
Fish of Venezuela
Taxa named by Charles Tate Regan
Fish described in 1912
Lebiasinidae